Youngs Creek is a stream in Callaway County in the U.S. state of Missouri. It is a tributary of Stinson Creek.

Youngs Creek was named after Judge Ben Young, an early settler.

See also
List of rivers of Missouri

References

Rivers of Callaway County, Missouri
Rivers of Missouri